Name conflict may refer to:

 Name collision
 Naming collision
 Identifier#Implicit context and namespace conflicts
 Name mangling
 Name conflicts with minor planets

See also 
 Scope (computer science)